The Hams Bluff Light is an historic lighthouse on Saint Croix, U.S. Virgin Islands. It was first lit in 1915 under the Danish Government. It was since transferred to the United States Lighthouse Service and later came under the jurisdiction of the United States Coast Guard. The historic tower has been abandoned; the beacon is now mounted on an adjacent new truss tower. The lighthouse was listed on the United States National Register of Historic Places in 2019.

Gallery

See also

 List of lighthouses in the United States Virgin Islands

References

External links
 Ham's Bluff Light
 Inventory of Historic Light Stations: Virgin Islands National Park Service

Lighthouses completed in 1915
Lighthouses in insular areas of the United States
Government buildings in the United States Virgin Islands
1910s establishments in the Caribbean
1915 establishments in Denmark
1915 establishments in North America
20th-century establishments in the Danish West Indies
National Register of Historic Places in the United States Virgin Islands
Lighthouses on the National Register of Historic Places